Nicholas Michael Hagadone (born January 1, 1986) is an American former professional baseball pitcher. He played in  Major League Baseball (MLB) for the Cleveland Indians.

He was selected by the Seattle Mariners in the 2004 Major League Baseball draft but didn't sign, instead opting to go to Bellevue Community College and later the University of Washington.  He was later selected by the Boston Red Sox with their first pick, 55th overall, in the 2007 Major League Baseball draft. He was rated by Baseball America as the 60th best prospect for the 2007 Draft.

Amateur career

High school
Hagadone graduated from Sumner High School in Sumner, Washington, a suburb southeast of Seattle.

College
Hagadone originally planned to attend Bellevue Community College but later received a scholarship to the University of Washington in Seattle. During his time as a Husky, he was the primary closer and teammates with future Cy Young Award winner Tim Lincecum. On March 12,  Lincecum and Hagadone teamed up for a no-hitter, the first for the Huskies since .

He was named First-Team All-Pac-10 his junior season in  after going 6–1 with 11 saves and a 2.77 ERA in 25 games, two starts for the UW. He had 72 strikeouts in  innings, an average of 9.5 strikeouts per nine innings and limited opposing hitters to a .235 average. He began the season as a starter but spent most of the year as the Huskies' closer. He was the only Husky to earn First-Team honors in 2007. He said this about his time at UW:

Professional career

Boston Red Sox
Hagadone reported to the Lowell Spinners of the Class A Short-Season New York–Penn League after signing his first professional contract with the Boston Red Sox on July 1, . He was roughed up in his pro debut, allowing five runs on six hits and a walk while fanning one over one and one third innings against the Aberdeen IronBirds on July 18. He said this about his pro debut:

He held opposing hitters to a .103 average and just one extra-base hit, a double, during his scoreless streak for the rest of 2007. He struck out at least one batter in each of his 10 starts and averaged 12.2 punchouts per 9.0 innings. His 1.85 ERA led all Spinners hurlers with at least 20.0 innings pitched.

In  he made three starts in his first full pro season at Class-A Greenville Drive of the South Atlantic League before being placed on the disabled list on April 19 and missing the rest of the season as the result of Tommy John surgery. He did not allow an earned run in 10 innings of work with the Drive, fanning 12 and allowing only five hits and three unearned runs. He gave up two unearned runs in his first inning of the season on April 5 against the Kannapolis Intimidators, snapping a personal 23-inning scoreless streak. He made his last start on April 16 against the Greensboro Grasshoppers, leaving the game following two and one third shutout innings.

Following the  season he was ranked by Baseball America as the Boston Red Sox number three prospect and the number two pitcher. He was also rated as having the best slider in the system for two straight seasons in 2007 and 2008.

Cleveland Indians
Prior to the 2009 trade deadline, Hagadone was traded with Justin Masterson and Bryan Price to the Cleveland Indians for catcher/first baseman Víctor Martínez.

After the 2010 season, Hagadone was added to the Indians' 40-man roster to protect him from the Rule 5 draft.

Hagadone was called up to the Indians on August 26, 2011. In a loss versus the Tampa Bay Rays on July 6, 2012, Hagadone fractured his left forearm in a fit of frustration. The injury required a metal screw to be inserted during surgery and recovery was expected to take 6–8 weeks. Said Indians manager Manny Acta, "I think Nick learned his lesson. A big part of this game is learning how to control your emotions." Hagadone was subsequently placed on the minor league disqualified list.

In 2014, Hagadone finished 1–0 with a 2.70 ERA and 27 strikeouts in 23.1 innings of relief. He played a total of 35 games.

Hagadone was designated for assignment on December 2, 2015. As that date was also the non-tender deadline that year, and the Indians did not tender him a contract, Hagadone subsequently became a free agent.

Milwaukee Brewers
Hagadone signed a minor league deal with the Milwaukee Brewers in December 2015. However, the deal was voided on January 11, 2016, and he became a free agent again. He didn't pitch professionally in 2016.

Seattle Mariners
On January 31, 2017, Hagadone signed a minor league deal with the Seattle Mariners. He was released on July 1, 2017.

Scouting report
Hagadone's four-seam fastball is approximately 92–95 miles per hour and tops out at about 98 miles per hour. He also has a two-seam fastball with similar velocity.

References

External links

 Nick Hagadone's Website: https://nickhagadone.com/

1986 births
Living people
People from Sandpoint, Idaho
Baseball players from Idaho
Major League Baseball pitchers
Cleveland Indians players
Washington Huskies baseball players
Lowell Spinners players
Greenville Drive players
Lake County Captains players
Kinston Indians players
Akron Aeros players
Columbus Clippers players
Águilas Cibaeñas players
American expatriate baseball players in the Dominican Republic
Mahoning Valley Scrappers players
Tacoma Rainiers players